Ian Tracey (born June 26, 1964) is a Canadian actor. Over the years, Tracey has participated in more than 70 films and television series. Tracey has starred in series such as Da Vinci's Inquest and Intelligence, both CBC television series produced by long-time colleague Chris Haddock. He is also known for his role as the title character in 1979's Huckleberry Finn and His Friends.

Life and career
Tracey was born on Vancouver Island, British Columbia, Canada. He grew up in British Columbia's Port Coquitlam. Tracey started working at the age of 11, playing in the 1976 film The Keeper, starring Christopher Lee. He is also the father of actor Keenan Tracey (b. 1991).

Tracey's recent feature film credits include Prozac Nation, Owning Mahowny, with Philip Seymour Hoffman, Kevin Costner's western Open Range, and Christopher Nolan's 2001 thriller Insomnia. In 1999, Tracey won the Leo Award for Best Performance by a Male in a Feature Length Drama for Rupert's Land.

Tracey has appeared in a number of movies-of-the-week, including starring in the title role of Milgaard, for which he won both the Gemini Award for Best Performance by an Actor in a Leading Role in a Dramatic Program or Mini-Series and Leo Award for Best Performance by a Male in a Picture in 1999.

Other television films include The Rookies, for which he received a 1991 Gemini nomination for Best Actor in a Supporting Role. He was nominated for a Gemini Award in 2000 for his portrayal of the talented Homicide Detective Mick Leary in the Canadian TV series Da Vinci's Inquest. He also directed two episodes in that television series, as well as two in Intelligence.

Tracey was a series regular on Sweating Bullets (also known as Tropical Heat) and had a recurring lead on The Commish. He was also seen in Taken and has guest starred on Smallville, Dark Angel, The Sentinel, The X-Files, The Outer Limits, Highlander: The Series, The Collector, 21 Jump Street, and Mom P.I.

In 2005, Tracey was in the TV miniseries Prairie Giant: The Tommy Douglas Story and Intelligence, a CBC television series about the interactions between organized crime and government intelligence services. In Intelligence, Tracey plays the head of a third-generation crime family that built its fortune on rum-running before turning to heroin and weed. He also appeared as Nova Group leader Daniel Armand in season three of the science fiction series The 4400 and guest-starred as Lincoln Cole in Smallville.

In 2010 he began the recurring role of villain Adam Worth on Sanctuary. In spring 2007, he filmed the Chinese-Canadian historical miniseries Iron Road with Sam Neill and Peter O'Toole and narrated the making-of documentary for the DVD release of the series Huckleberry Finn and His Friends. Most recently, he appeared in 4 seasons of Bates Motel as Remo Wallace.

Filmography

Film

Television

References

External links

1964 births
Male actors from British Columbia
Canadian male child actors
Canadian male film actors
Canadian male television actors
Canadian male voice actors
Canadian Screen Award winners
Living people
Place of birth missing (living people)
People from Vancouver Island